Sürmene Naval Base is a projected base of the Turkish Navy on the south-east coast of the Black Sea in Sürmene, Trabzon in northeastern Turkey.

The naval base will be built in Çamlimanı in Sürmene district of Trabzon Province on land covering . It will serve logistic support for the fleets of frigates, submarines and fast attack crafts patrolling at eastern Black Sea. It is planned that about 400 navy personnel will be stationed, and around 200 civil personnel will be employed at the base.

References

Turkish Navy bases
Economy of Trabzon Province
Military in Trabzon Province
Buildings and structures in Trabzon Province
Sürmene
Buildings and structures under construction in Turkey